The men's 102 kilograms competition at the 2022 World Weightlifting Championships was held on 12 and 13 December 2022.

Schedule

Medalists

Records

Results

References

Men's 102 kg